Jeffrey M. McCabe is an American politician who is a former member of the Maine House of Representatives. He is a member of the Democratic Party, and served as Majority Leader from 2014 until 2016.

Career
McCabe was first elected to the State House in 2008, defeating incumbent Donna Finley.  He has served on the Agriculture, Conservation, and Forestry Committee.

In addition to his political career, McCabe works as a Maine Guide and serves as Director of Lake George Regional Park, a park located in the towns of Skowhegan and Canaan. He has formerly served as Executive Director of the Somerset County Soil and Water Conservation District.

Personal life
McCabe graduated from Unity College with a Bachelor of Science in environmental education. He lives in Skowhegan with his wife and three children.

Political future
After U.S. Representative Mike Michaud announced in June 2013 that he was exploring a run for governor, McCabe was mentioned as a potential candidate for Michaud's House seat.

He announced on January 4, 2016 that he would run for Skowhegan's Maine Senate seat, currently held by Republican Rodney Whittemore.

References

External links
Maine House Democrats biography

Living people
Democratic Party members of the Maine House of Representatives
Unity College (Maine) alumni
People from Skowhegan, Maine
21st-century American politicians
Year of birth missing (living people)